Top of the Form was a BBC radio and television quiz show for teams from secondary schools in the United Kingdom which ran for 38 years, from 1948 to 1986.

The programme began on Saturday 1 May 1948, as a radio series, at 7.30pm on the Light Programme. It progressed to become a TV series from 1962 to 1975. A decision to stop the programme was announced on 28 September 1986 and the last broadcast was on Tuesday 2 December. The producer, Graham Frost, was reported to have said it had been cancelled because the competitive nature of the show jarred with modern educational philosophy.

Hosts

 Wynford Vaughan-Thomas
 Lionel Gamlin
 Richard Dimbleby
 David Dimbleby
 John Ellison
 Robert MacDermot (died on Saturday 21 November 1964 at Central Middlesex Hospital aged 54, after tripping and falling at London Airport, fracturing bones)
 Kenneth Horne
 John Edmunds
 John Dunn
 Tim Gudgin (1965–86)
 Bob Holness (1974–76)
 Paddy Feeny (1965–86)
 Bill Salmon (Australia 1967–1968)
 Geoffrey Wheeler (1962–75)

Format
Each school fielded a team of four pupils ranging in age from under 13 to under 18.

Transmission

Radio
 BBC Light Programme from 1948 to 1967
 BBC Radio 2 (sometimes simulcast on BBC Radio 1) 1967–70
 BBC Radio 4 from 26 September 1970 – 1986.

Joan Clark had produced a weekly radio quiz from 1945 called Quiz Team, with two teams of four, with question master Roy Rich. On Sunday 23 May 1948, this transformed into Ask Me, Another! on the Home Service, with teams of four, with question master Lionel Gamlin. Via What Do You Know from 2 August 1953, this became Brain of Britain in 1967.

The programme was largely invented by Joan Clark;she had mostly worked as a reporter on In Town Tonight. When aged 41, she married 47 year old John Peter Wynn, at Caxton Hall Register Office on Tuesday 22 December 1953. Wynn was half-Welsh and half-Danish, could speak seven languages. He would fly each week to Munich or Lausanne for competitions.

The May 1948 radio series began as a knock-out competition for London schools only, where the winning team that of each transmission would appear in the next week's edition.

The radio national competition (but for boys' schools only) began on Sunday 3 October 1948 at 7.30pm on the Light Programme, with London against Birmingham, and with question master Lionel Gamlin, which was won by Owen's School of Islington, who were later beaten by Liverpool Collegiate School in the second round.

After a request from a Northern Ireland listener, girls teams were added, as an experiment. The first girls' schools appeared on Monday 3 October 1949, with the independent Church High School for Girls in Newcastle-upon-Tyne, and the girls' team won that first round, with two girls' schools later topping the England section. Girls' teams would always play boys' teams in the first rounds of the radio competition. The radio editions would be repeated on a Saturday at 12pm from this year, also this was continued in all subsequent years. In the two semi-finals for this first year of girls' teams, three of the four teams were from girls' schools, but only one girls' team reached the final - Grove Park Grammar School for Girls (from north Wales), and the boys' team won the final.

The series first appeared on the Home Service when the first international series was repeated on Monday 29 May 1950 at 11am; this international series had originally begun on 18 April 1950 on the Light Programme. From October 1950, the radio national competition was first broadcast on Tuesdays on the Light Programme, then repeated on Saturday at 9.30am on the Home Service, starting from Saturday 7 October 1950.

The first coeducational schools appeared on Saturday 12 May 1951 in the international Scandinavian Top of the Form, which was for coeducational schools only. This international series was repeated much later in July 1951, on the Home Service; later international and national series would not be for coeducational schools only.

A possible precursor of University Challenge began on the Light Programme on Tuesday 24 April 1956 at 7.30pm entitled Commonwealth Quiz, where teams of four, from universities in Australia and the UK competed, which was produced by Joan Clark. Creighton Burns presented in Australia, with production by ABC (Australian Broadcasting Corporation), and was carried by the General Overseas Service (BBC World Service.

Another similar radio quiz of Joan Clark was called Namesake Towns, on the Home Service on Saturday afternoons, from Saturday 15 November 1958, where teams from towns of the same name in Australia and Britain would compete, again made with ABC of Australia.

Television
The programme was first aired on TV in two special experiments. The first was on 25 April 1953, featuring Sheffield High School (girls) v. Marylebone Grammar School (boys). A second TV broadcast was performed in 1954 featuring Lady Margaret High School for Girls (Cardiff) v Solihull School for Boys. The programme fully migrated to TV later. It ran from 1962 to 1975, and was called Television Top of the Form. It began on Monday 12 November 1962, when the Controller of BBC1 was Stuart Hood (Scottish).

The questions were set by polymath and author Boswell Taylor on behalf of BBC TV and he was assisted by the BBC's Mary Craig who doubled as the scorer and electronic score board operator. In order to set appropriate questions the selected contestants from each school filled in a questionnaire listing their interests, books recently read and favourite music. The teams from co-ed schools usually included two girls and two boys.

Compared to many television quiz shows in recent years, Top of the Form had a resolutely grandiose outlook; nothing would ever be dumbed down. Consequently, on Monday 18 June 1973 it had its first bilingual competition, with Paris v London. The competition on Monday 25 March 1974 was all in the Welsh language.

In 1967 UK schools took on Australian schools in Top of the Form: Transworld Edition. The following year this was renamed Transworld Top Team, under which title it ran until 1973. Each series involved teams from the UK taking on teams from another country. Countries participating over the course of the run included Canada, The Netherlands, the US and Hong Kong.

In 1975 the TV version moved to 4.10–4.35pm on Sundays, then from 3.55 to 4.20, with the last final on 9 August 1975. One of the producers of the TV version was Bill Wright, who would later devise Mastermind in the early 1970s.

Theme
The tune Marching Strings (composition credited to "Marshall Ross", a pseudonym of Ray Martin) was the theme for many years, though for the last few series, Emerson, Lake & Palmer's recording of Aaron Copland's Fanfare for the Common Man was used. Earlier, Debussy's Golliwog's Cakewalk, from his Children's Corner suite, had introduced the radio series.

Marching Strings had been featured in the popular 1956 British film It's Great to be Young! where a music teacher's job was saved by the efforts of his students.

Producers
Producers have included:
 Paul Mayhew-Archer (1970s), later to produce BBC radio comedy
 Griff Rhys Jones

Contestants
The series tended to feature grammar schools; in later years, as these schools became less numerous, comprehensive schools sometimes featured, but less often, and there was an increasing dominance by independent schools.

However, as comprehensive schools were becoming more commonplace under the Harold Wilson government, the autumn 1967 TV series of Top of the Form featured only comprehensive schools.

Top of the Form finalists

Television Top of the Form finalists

Other television competitions
 Monday 3 May 1965 BBC1 multilingual (German) Latymer Upper School v Gelehrtenschule des Johanneums of Hamburg, recorded mid-April 65, it was recorded as two versions, one English one German; Latymer won 38-31 in the English version (John Barton aged 16, Peter Bennington aged 17 of Putney, Stephen Ankers aged 15 of Teddington, Mark Woodland aged 14 of Wandsworth); the German presenter was Hans Friedrichs of ZDF

 Monday 18 June 1973 BBC1 multilingual (French), the first bilingual TV quiz, where alternate rounds were English or French, with subtitles against Laurence Meary from Lycée et collège Victor-Duruy, Christian Dors from Lycée Louis-le-Grand, Brigitte Godelier from Lycée Marie Curie (Sceaux), Eric Laboureur from Lycée Jacques Prévert (Boulogne-Billancourt).

Notable contestants
 Film star Hugh Grant, who represented Latymer Upper School; (v Westminster City School on Tuesday 16 November 1976, first round in the series; v Kingswood School, Bath on Tuesday 11 January 1977, second round; v Macclesfield County High School for Girls on Tuesday 8 February 1977, semi-final; Latymer lost this round)
 Darien Angadi, whose story was told during a BBC Four documentary about the quiz programme
 Vivien Stuart (1969), later a weather presenter and television announcer.
 Hilary Benn, represented Holland Park School in 1969 who were contentiously eliminated in a second round match.
 Robbie Fields, identical twin of Randolph and now owner of Posh Boy Records, was also a member of the 1969 Holland Park School team. Fields was asked the three-point question: "I was born in Valencia in 1867, who am I?" and answered "Blasco Ibáñez", prompting presenter Geoffrey Wheeler to take a deep breath and pronounce the answer correct and leaving viewers baffled.
 15 year old Derek Reeh of Newbury, who was in the school cricket team, and appeared on Wednesday 28 September 1966 on BBC1 for Newbury Grammar School, with captain 17 year old Harvey Mitchell of Tadley, who wanted to study history; 14 year old Philip Kinns of Speen, who liked stamp collecting; and 12 year old Neil Readmond of Newbury who wanted to be a teacher. Derek Reeh (born 17 January 1951), of Newbury Badminton Club, would study Aeronautical Engineering at Queen Mary College from 1969 to 1972 and would later be an RAF Jaguar pilot, and the chief test pilot for British Aerospace from 1995, flying the first British two-seat Eurofighter Typhoon ZH590 on Friday 14 March 1997 over Lancashire. Dr Philip Kinns (born 4 April 1952) joined Stanley Gibbons in 1970, and has worked with the Royal Numismatic Society.
 13 year old Richard Littlejohn, of Peterborough, was in a team of four boys against Kings Norton Grammar School for Girls, broadcast on Sunday 22 October 1967 on the new BBC Radio 2, which was recorded on Tuesday 19 September 1967. Also in the team were Michael Conning aged 12, Martin Bradshaw aged 15 of Walton, and the captain Martin Chambers. It was recorded in the school hall with John Ellison; Tim Gudgin was at Kings Norton.
 Helene Hayman, Baroness Hayman, Labour MP from October 1974 to May 1979 for Welwyn Hatfield - as Helene Middleweek she competed for Wolverhampton Girls' High School on Thursday 19 November 1964 on BBC One; later aged 19, she would be the second female president of the Cambridge Union in March 1969; aged 22 she tried to be selected for Hitchin against the 26 year old Ann Mallalieu, Baroness Mallalieu, the first female president of the Cambridge Union, and also a law graduate from Newnham College, Cambridge but as a 24 year old social worker was selected to fight Enoch Powell on Saturday 25 November 1972, until Enoch Powell stood down as candidate on Thursday 7 February 1974, and despite Enoch Powell casting a postal vote for her, she came second by 6,901 votes

Popular culture
Top of The Form was satirised in the 1960s pre-Python television series At Last the 1948 Show.

"Natural Born Quizzers", an episode of Steve Coogan's comedy series Coogan's Run, involved a thinly-disguised version of the show.

In 2008, Dave Gorman traced the history of the show on BBC Four.

A similar quiz for British schools in Germany called Top Marks was broadcast by BFBS Germany.

See also
 Round Britain Quiz, BBC Radio 4's general knowledge quiz from the same era, but mainly for adults, and still broadcast regularly
 University Challenge, a similar Granada Television series for British universities, which was (likewise) taken off the air in 1987, but was brought back (now broadcast on BBC 2) in 1994
 Schools' Challenge – continuing UK inter-schools quiz, non-televised, based on the rules of University Challenge
 Young Scientists of the Year, BBC youth science competition
 Blockbusters – television school-age game show first broadcast in 1983

References

External links
 
 
 
 
 
 TV Cream

Video clips
 Monty Python

1948 radio programme debuts
1940s British game shows
1950s British game shows
1960s British game shows
1970s British game shows
1980s British game shows
1962 British television series debuts
1975 British television series endings
1986 radio programme endings
BBC Radio 4 programmes
BBC Radio 2 programmes
BBC television game shows
British panel games
British radio game shows
British educational television series
Secondary schools in the United Kingdom
Student quiz competitions
Television articles with incorrect naming style
Television game shows with incorrect disambiguation

Lycée Jeunes Filles
Maerlant-Lyceum